Mykhailo Vilkhovyi (born 13 April 1958 in the Ukrainian SSR of the Soviet Union - in present-day Ukraine) is a Ukrainian football manager.

Positively about Vilkhovyi talked another Ukrainian coach from Kharkiv Valentyn Khodukin whom Vilkhovyi convinced to become a coach and became the first head coach of revived FC Skala Stryi at the end of 1991. According to Khodukin, Vilkhovyi along with Anatoliy Kroshchenko were involved in coaching of national football team.

References

External links
 Mykhailo Vilkhovyi. Footballfacts.ru

1958 births
Living people
Ukrainian football managers
FC Skala Stryi (1911) managers
FC Lviv managers
FC Hazovyk Komarno managers
FC Dynamo Lviv managers